The eighth season of Akademi Fantasia premiered on 13 March 2010 and continued until 22 May 2010 on the Astro Ria television channel. The show underwent a number of changes from the seventh season, including the return Adlin Aman Ramlie as judge while Aznil Nawawi joined the judging panel following the departures of Khatijah Ibrahim and Edry Hashim. 

The professional trainers for this season were announced in a press conference for media which took place in Hilton Hotel, Kuala Lumpur on 8 February 2010. In the ceremony, Norman Abdul Halim was revealed to be the Principal for this season, while Sarimah Ibrahim and Jimmy Shanley were selected as the new hosts replacing AC Mizal.

The eight season saw a new change to the format of the show. Instead of eliminating a student at the end of each concert, the elimination process was conducted in a new 30-minute segment called Debaran Akademi Fantasia, which was conducted by Sarimah Ibrahim.

The final concert was broadcast live in high definition technology, an Akademi Fantasia first, which was accessible for Astro B.yond subscribers in Channel 124 through Astro.

On 22 May 2010, Ahmad Shahir Zawawi from Kampar, Perak was announced the winner of the eighth season of Akademi Fantasia, defeating Siti Adira Suhaimi. He made history for being the first student to win the title after being re-entered into the competition through AFMASUK following his elimination in Week 7.

As many as 3.75 million votes were cast the entire season.

Auditions

Auditions were held in the following cities:

National Stadium, Bukit Jalil, Kuala Lumpur - 9 & 10 January 
The Zon, Johor Bahru, Johor - 16 & 17 January
Redbox Gurney, Plaza Gurney, Penang - 16 & 17 January
Promenade Hotel, Kota Kinabalu, Sabah - 22, 23 & 24 January
Merdeka Palace Hotel, Kuching, Sarawak - 23 & 24 January
National Stadium, Bukit Jalil, Kuala Lumpur - 30 & 31 January

List of songs during auditions

Songs for female
 "Gagap" – Stacy
 "Jika Kau Ubah Fikiran" - Mila
 "Tak Mungkin Kerna Sayang" - Alyah
 "Dan Sebenarnya" - Yuna
 "Di Taman Teman" - Datuk Siti Nurhaliza
 "When You're Gone" - Avril Lavigne

Songs for male
 "Situasi" – Bunkface
 "Hujan" – Sudirman Arshad
 "Ada Untukmu" – Nubhan
 "Berdendang Dalam Tangisan" – Jamal Abdillah
 "Fikirlah" – Aizat
 "I'm Yours" - Jason Mraz

Contestants were required to be between the ages of 18 to 45, and are Malaysian and Singaporean citizens who are not embedded with recording or management contracts.

Concert summaries

Tirai Concert
Original Airdate: 13 March 2010

Week 1
Original Airdate: 20 March 2010

Week 2
Original Airdate: 27 March 2010

Week 3
Original Airdate: 3 April 2010

Week 4
Original Airdate: 10 April 2010

Week 5
Original Airdate: 17 April 2010

Week 6
Original Airdate: 24 April 2010

Week 7
Original Airdate: 1 May 2010

Week 8
Original Airdate: 8 May 2010

Week 9
Original Airdate: 15 May 2010

Week 10
Original Airdate: 22 May 2010

Students
(ages stated are at time of contest)

Summaries

Elimination chart

 The student won the competition
 The student was the runner-up
 The student was the second runner-up
 The students were finalists
 The student was the original eliminee but was saved
 The student was re-entered into the competition through AFMASUK
 The student was eliminated

 In week 5, there was no elimination. The accumulated votes were forwarded to the following week.
 In week 8, Shahir was re-entered into the competition after scoring the highest votes through AFMASUK.

Cast members

Hosts
 Jimmy Shanley - Host of concert of Akademi Fantasia and Diari Akademi Fantasia
 Sarimah Ibrahim - Host of concert of Akademi Fantasia and Debaran Akademi Fantasia

Professional trainers
 Norman Abdul Halim - Principal
 Shafizawati Sharif - Vocal Technical
 Siti Hajar Ismail - Vocal Presentation
 Linda Jasmine - Choreographer
 Fatimah Abu Bakar - English Language Consultant & Counsellor
 Que Haidar - Drama & Acting

Judges
 Adlin Aman Ramlie
 Aznil Nawawi

Season statistics
Total number of students: 12
Oldest student: Zafarina Jamhari, 28 years old
Youngest students: Dayang Nor Anum Arjuna Aharun & Muhammad Alif Kadim, both 18 years old
Tallest student: Muhd Firdaus Maulana Mohamed, 5'6.7" (173 cm)
Shortest student: Siti Adira Suhaimi, 4'9" (152 cm)
Heaviest student: Muhammed Shahril Mohd Saleh Hussein, 176 lbs (80 kg)
Lightest student: Nadia Emilia Roselan, 94 lb (43 kg)
Student with the most collective highest votes:  Siti Adira Suhaimi, 5 times
Student with the most consecutive highest votes: Siti Adira Suhaimi, 3 times
Top 3's vote mean (excluding finale): Ahmad Shahir Zawawi – 3.5, Siti Adira Suhaimi - 2.22, Muhd Shahril Firdaus Eli - 4.0,
Top 3's vote median (excluding finale): Ahmad Shahir Zawawi – 3, Siti Adira Suhaimi - 1, Muhd Shahril Firdaus Eli - 3
Student with the most collective bottom two appearances: Zafarina Jamhari, 5 times
Student with the most consecutive bottom two appearances: Zafarina Jamhari, 5 times
Student with no bottom two appearances: Siti Adira Suhaimi

References

External links
 Official Site
 Official Web Portal Akademi Fantasia

2010 Malaysian television seasons
Akademi Fantasia seasons

id:Akademi Fantasia